A self-report inventory is a type of psychological test in which a person fills out a survey or questionnaire with or without the help of an investigator. Self-report inventories often ask direct questions about personal interests, values, symptoms, behaviors, and traits or personality types. Inventories are different from tests in that there is no objectively correct answer; responses are based on opinions and subjective perceptions. Most self-report inventories are brief and can be taken or administered within five to 15 minutes, although some, such as the Minnesota Multiphasic Personality Inventory (MMPI), can take several hours to fully complete.  They are popular because they can be inexpensive to give and to score, and their scores can often show good reliability.

There are three major approaches to developing self-report inventories: theory-guided, factor analysis, and criterion-keyed.  Theory-guided inventories are constructed around a theory of personality or a prototype of a construct.  Factor analysis uses statistical methods to organize groups of related items into subscales. Criterion-keyed inventories include questions that have been shown to statistically discriminate between a comparison group and a criterion group, such as people with clinical diagnoses of depression versus a control group.

Items may use any of several formats: a Likert scale with ranked options, true-false, or forced choice, although other formats such as sentence completion or visual analog scales are possible. True-false involves questions that the individual denotes as either being true or false about themselves.  Forced-choice is a set of statements that require the individual to choose one as being most representative of themselves.

If the inventory includes items from different factors or constructs, the items can be mixed together or kept in groups. Sometimes the way people answer the item will change depending on the context offered by the neighboring items.

Personality inventories
Self-report personality inventories include questions dealing with behaviours, responses to situations, characteristic thoughts and beliefs, habits, symptoms, and feelings. Test-takers-are usually asked to indicate how well each item describes themselves or how much they agree with each item. Formats are varied, from adjectives such as "warm", to sentences such as "I like parties", or reports of behaviour "I have driven past the speed limit" and response formats from yes/no to Likert scales, to continuous "slider" responses. Some inventories are global, such as the NEO, others focus on particular domains, such as anger or aggression.

Limitations
Unlike IQ tests where there are correct answers that have to be worked out by test takers, for personality, attempts by test-takers to gain particular scores are an issue in applied testing. Test items are often transparent, and people may "figure out" how to respond to make themselves appear to possess whatever qualities they think an organization wants. In addition, people may falsify good responses, be biased towards their positive characteristics, or falsify bad, stressing negative characteristics, in order to obtain their preferred outcome. In clinical settings patients may exaggerate symptoms in order to make their situation seem worse, or under-report the severity or frequency of symptoms in order to minimize their problems. For this reason, self-report inventories are not used in isolation to diagnose a mental disorder, often used as screeners for verification by other assessment data. Many personality tests, such as the MMPI or the MBTI add questions that are designed to make it difficult for a person to exaggerate traits and symptoms. They are in common use for measuring levels of traits, or for symptom severity and change. Clinical discretion is advised for all self-report inventories.

Items may differ in social desirability, which can cause different scores for people at the same level of a trait, but differing in their desire to appear to possess socially desirable behaviors.

Popular self-report inventories
 16 PF
 Beck Anxiety Inventory
 Beck Depression Inventory
 Beck Hopelessness Scale
 California Psychological Inventory (CPI)
 CORE-OM
 Eysenck Personality Questionnaire (EPQ-R)
 Geriatric Depression Scale
 Major Depression Inventory
 Minnesota Multiphasic Personality Inventory
 Myers-Briggs Type Indicator
NEO Personality Inventory (NEO-PI-3)
Outcome Questionnaire 45
 PSYCHLOPS
 State-Trait Anxiety Inventory

See also
Self-report study
Affect measures
Patient-reported outcome

Further reading
Aiken, L. R. (2002) Psychological Testing and Assessment. New York: Allyn & Bacon
 Schultz, Sydney Ellen; Schultz, Duane P. (2005). Psychology and Work Today. New York: Prentice Hall. p. 116. .

References

Personality tests
Patient reported outcome measures